Friedrich Hermann von Schönberg, 1st Duke of Schomberg, 1st Count of Mertola,  (6 December 1615 – 1 July 1690) was a Marshal of France and a general in the English and Portuguese army. He was killed at the Battle of the Boyne in 1690.

Early career
Descended from an old family of the Electorate of the Palatinate, he was born at Heidelberg, the son of Count Hans Meinhard von Schönberg (1582–1616) and Anne, a daughter of Edward Sutton, 5th Baron Dudley, and Theodosia Harington. An orphan within a few months of his birth, he was educated by various family friends, among whom was Frederick V, Elector Palatine, in whose service his father had been. He began his military career under Frederick Henry, Prince of Orange, and in 1634 passed into the service of Sweden, entering that of France in 1635. His family, and the allied house of the Saxon Schönbergs, had already attained eminence in France with Henri de Schomberg and Charles de Schomberg, both marshals of France.

After a time he retired to his family estate at Geisenheim on the Rhine, but in 1639 he re-entered the Dutch States Army, in which, apparently, apart from a few intervals at Geisenheim, he remained until about 1650. He then rejoined the French army as a general officer (maréchal de camp), served under Turenne in the campaigns against Condé, and became a lieutenant-general in 1665, receiving this rapid promotion perhaps partly owing to his relationship with Charles de Schomberg, duc d'Halluin.

After the peace of the Pyrenees (1659), the independence of Portugal was threatened by Spain, and Schomberg was sent as military adviser to Lisbon with the secret approval of Charles II of England.  Louis XIV of France, in order not to infringe the treaty just made with Spain, deprived Schomberg of his French officers. Schomberg thus took command of the English brigade which consisted of three regiments in total 3,000 men. Many of these were ex Royalist and New Model Army troops from the Civil War. After many difficulties in the three first campaigns resulting from the opposition of Portuguese officers, the Portuguese commander António Luís de Meneses, 1st Marquis of Marialva, together with Schomberg won the victory of Montes Claros on 17 June 1665 over the Spaniards under Luis de Benavides Carrillo, Marquis of Caracena.

After participating with his army in the revolution which deposed the reigning king Afonso VI of Portugal in favour of his brother Dom Pedro, and ending the war with Spain, Schomberg returned to France, became a naturalised Frenchman and bought the lordship of Coubert near Paris. He had been rewarded by the king of Portugal, in 1663, with the rank of Grandee, the title of count of Mértola and a pension of f 5000 a year. In 1673 he was brought by Charles II to England to take command of the newly formed Blackheath Army, which was planned to take part in an invasion of the Dutch Republic during the Third Anglo-Dutch War. However the army did not go into action before the Treaty of Westminster established peace, and was disbanded by the King following Parliamentary pressure.

He therefore again entered the service of France. His first operations in Catalonia were unsuccessful owing to the disobedience of subordinates and the rawness of his troops. On 19 June 1674, he was dealt a defeat at the Battle of Maureillas by Francisco de Tutavilla y del Rufo, but he retrieved the failure by retaking Fort de Bellegarde in 1675. For this he was made a marshal, being included in the promotion that followed the death of Turenne. The tide had now turned against the Huguenots, and Schomberg's merits had been long ignored on account of his adherence to the Protestant religion. The revocation of the Edict of Nantes (1685) forced him to leave his adopted country.

Ultimately he became general-in-chief of the forces of the Frederick William, Elector of Brandenburg, and at Berlin he was the acknowledged leader of the thousands of Huguenot refugees there. Soon afterwards, with the Electors consent, he joined the Prince of Orange on his expedition to England in 1688, the Glorious Revolution, as second in command to the prince. The following year he was made a Knight of the Garter, 
was appointed Master-General of the Ordnance, was created Duke of Schomberg, and received from the House of Commons a vote of £100,000 to compensate him for the loss of his French estates, of which Louis had deprived him.

Ireland

In July 1689, William appointed him commander-in-chief of the expedition that he undertook to drive James II out of Ireland. Before departing to Ireland, Schomberg took his leave from parliament on 16 July 1689. On 20 July Schomberg arrived at Chester where the expedition's troops were gathering. Sailing with a fleet from Hoylake, he landed on 13 August 1689 at Ballyholme Bay near Bangor. He made the passage on the royal yacht Cleveland. He then marched over Bangor and Belfast to Carrickfergus, which had a Jacobite garrison. He began the siege of Carrickfergus on 20 August. The town surrendered on 28 August. Thereafter he marched unopposed through a country desolated before him to Dundalk, but, as the bulk of his forces were raw and undisciplined as well as inferior in numbers to the enemy Irish Army, he deemed it imprudent to risk a battle, and entrenching himself at Dundalk declined to be drawn beyond the circle of his defences. Shortly afterwards pestilence broke out, and when he retired to winter quarters in Ulster his forces were more shattered than if they had sustained a severe defeat.

His conduct was criticized in ill-informed quarters, but the facts justified his inactivity, and he gave what was said at the time to be a "striking example of his generous spirit" in placing at William of Orange's disposal for military purposes the £100,000 recently granted to him. In the spring he began the campaign with the capture of Charlemont, but no advance southward was made until William arrived with reinforcements. At the Battle of the Boyne (1 July 1690), Schomberg gave his opinion against the determination of William to cross the river in face of the opposing army. After riding through the river to rally his men, he was wounded twice in the head by sabre cuts, and was shot in the neck by Cahir O'Toole of Ballyhubbock and instantly killed.

Family
His eldest son Charles Schomberg, the second duke in the English peerage, died in the year 1693 of wounds received at the Battle of Marsaglia. His other son was Meinhardt Schomberg, 3rd Duke of Schomberg.

Burial and inscription

He was buried in St Patrick's Cathedral, Dublin, where there is a monument to him, erected in 1731. On the monument is a Latin inscription by Jonathan Swift, which reads:

The English translation:

Additionally, the Boyne Obelisk (which was erected on the north bank of the River Boyne in 1736, to commemorate the Williamite victory at the Battle of the Boyne, and later destroyed in 1923) contained an inscription to him on its south side base, reading:

The village of Schomberg, Ontario is named after him.

Notes

References 
 Glozier, Matthew.  Brighton, 2005.

External links

 Schomberg Society

1615 births
1690 deaths
Nobility from Heidelberg
17th-century French nobility
Counts of Germany
Counts of Mértola
Marshals of France
Prussian Army personnel
101
Peers of England created by William III
Garter Knights appointed by William III
Burials at St Patrick's Cathedral, Dublin
English generals
British military personnel killed in action in the Nine Years' War
German emigrants to England
Royal Scots officers
Williamite military personnel of the Williamite War in Ireland
Military personnel from Heidelberg
Dutch military personnel of the Nine Years' War